C. Velupillai Kandaiah Sivagnanam is a Sri Lankan Tamil civil servant, politician and provincial councillor.

Sivagnanam was commissioner of Jaffna Municipal Council. After retirement, he contested the 2004 and 2010 parliamentary elections as one of the Tamil National Alliance's candidates in Jaffna District but on each occasion failed to get elected.

Sivagnanam contested the 2013 provincial council election as one of the Tamil National Alliance's candidates in Jaffna District and was elected to the Northern Provincial Council. He took his oath as provincial councillor in front of Chief Minister C. V. Vigneswaran at Veerasingam Hall on 11 October 2013. He was elected unopposed as Chairman of the Northern Provincial Council at its inaugural meeting on 25 October 2013.

References

Illankai Tamil Arasu Kachchi politicians
Living people
Members of the Northern Provincial Council
People from Northern Province, Sri Lanka
Sri Lankan Tamil civil servants
Sri Lankan Tamil politicians
Tamil National Alliance politicians
Year of birth missing (living people)